Charles Russell Codman (October 29, 1828 – October 5, 1918) was an American military officer and politician who served as commander of the 45th Massachusetts Infantry Regiment.

Early life
Codman was born on October 29, 1828 in Paris while his parents, Charles Russell and Anne (Macmaster) Codman. He was educated in private schools, including at one of William Augustus Muhlenberg's model schools on Long Island. He graduated from Harvard College in 1849 and thereafter studied law in the office of Charles G. Loring. Codman was admitted to the bar in 1852 and practiced for a short time before entering the business world.

Personal life
On February 28, 1856, Codman married Lucy Lyman Paine Sturgis, daughter of Russell Sturgis, in Walton-on-Thames. They had nine children, five of which (Russell Sturgis, John Sturgis, Julian, Anne Macmaster Cabot and Susan Welles Fiske) survived into adulthood. Anne Macmaster (Codman) Cabot was the mother of Paul Codman Cabot and Charles Codman Cabot. Russell Sturgis Codman was the father of Russell S. Codman Jr. and Charles R. Codman.

The Codmans resided at the Col. Charles Codman Estate in Cotuit, Massachusetts and spent their winters in Boston. Codman's Cotuit home was constructed in 1867 on Bluff Point. The Victorian Stick mansion was built by Charles L. Baxter based on John Hubbard Sturgis's plans for Andrew Lovell's Red House. Codman also resided for many years at 123 High Street in Brookline, Massachusetts.

Civil War
On March 12, 1861, Codman enlisted in the Union Army as captain and adjutant. In 1862 he was commissioned into the Boston Cadets at Fort Warren. Following President Abraham Lincoln's July 1, 1862 call for three hundred thousand soldiers, the Cadets began recruiting a nine month regiment. Codman was selected to be commander of this regiment, which was to be known as the 45th Massachusetts Infantry Regiment. Codman led the regiment during the Battles of Kinston and White Hall, as well as in skirmishes in and around New Bern, North Carolina. On July 21, 1863, the 45th Massachusetts was discharged from service.

Political career
Codman served on the Boston school committee in 1861 and 1862, in the Massachusetts Senate in 1864 and 1865, and in the Massachusetts House of Representatives from 1872 to 1875. He was the Republican nominee in the 1878 Boston mayoral election, but lost to Democrat Frederick O. Prince 52% to 47%. In 1884, Codman joined the Mugwump movement in support of Democrat presidential candidate Grover Cleveland due to his opposition to the Republican nominee James G. Blaine. The Democrats support of low tariffs led Codman to join the party for good and in 1890 he ran for the United States House of Representatives as an Independent Democrat.

Other work
Codman was president of the Harvard Board of Overseers in 1880, 1881, 1879, and 1880. He also served as president of the Massachusetts Homeopathic Hospital.

Death
Codman died on October 5, 1918 at his home in Cotuit.

References

External links

1828 births
1918 deaths
Harvard College alumni
Massachusetts Democrats
Massachusetts Republicans
Massachusetts state senators
Members of the Harvard Board of Overseers
Members of the Massachusetts House of Representatives
People from Cotuit, Massachusetts
People of Massachusetts in the American Civil War
Politicians from Boston
Union Army colonels
Politicians from Paris